Little Sonny Warner (October 30, 1930 – April 12, 2007) was an American blues singer.

Haywood S. Warner was born in 1930 in Falls Church, Virginia, United States, and in the early 1950s, Warner sang as a backing vocalist for Van Walls on the Atlantic Records releases "After Midnight" and "Open the Door". His career received a boost in 1957, when he filled in for Lloyd Price at the Apollo Theatre in Harlem.

Warner's biggest hit was saxophonist Big Jay McNeely's "There's Something On Your Mind", which became a gold record for Checker Records in 1959. He performed with James Brown, Etta James and B.B. King. In his later years, Warner often performed at concerts and festivals in Falls Church.

He died in his hometown in April 2007, at the age of 76.

References

External links
 F.C. Native and Gold Record Winner Haywood ‘Little Sonny’ Warner Dies

1930 births
2007 deaths
American blues singers
Singers from Virginia
People from Falls Church, Virginia
20th-century American singers